Maureen Darbyshire   is an English actress who appeared in six out of the seven series of Rumpole of the Bailey as Chambers Secretary at 1 Equity Court; and also appeared in  other roles on television.

Notes

English television actresses
Year of birth missing (living people)
Possibly living people